Andrea Bosco (born 6 October 1995) is an Italian-born Dominican footballer who plays as a centre back for Serie D club Pineto and the Dominican Republic national team.

International career
Bosco's mother is Dominican. He made his senior international debut in 2021.

References

1995 births
Living people
Citizens of the Dominican Republic through descent
Dominican Republic footballers
Association football central defenders
Dominican Republic international footballers
Dominican Republic people of Italian descent
Footballers from Milan
Italian footballers
S.F. Aversa Normanna players
S.S.D. Città di Campobasso players
U.S. Savoia 1908 players
A.S.D. Nerostellati Frattese players
A.S.D. Francavilla players
S.S.D. Pro Sesto players
Serie D players
Serie C players
Eccellenza players
Serie B players
Italian people of Dominican Republic descent
Sportspeople of Dominican Republic descent